"Slow Motion" is a song by Swedish Eurodance singer and former rapper Leila K. It was released in 1993 as the third single from her solo-album, Carousel. The song is produced by Denniz Pop and Douglas Carr and peaked at No. 27 on the Swedish single chart and at No. 26 in Austria.

Music video 
The animated music video takes place in a desert setting and mixing elements from middle-eastern, african, asian and Jamaican cultures. A flying Leila K and posse on a flying carpet arrive in a desert village. A blue genie appears from a lamp.

Critical reception
AllMusic editor Dean Carlson wrote that "Slow Motion" "spins out from under its foundational flavor of European techno-reggae and ends up sounding like a cross between M/A/R/R/S, Madonna, Mis-Teeq, and Big Audio Dynamite. Absurd and unquestionably wonderful."

Track listing
 Maxi Single (Scandinavia)
 "Slow Motion" (Short Version) - 4:00 
 "Slow Motion" (Long Version) - 6:25 
 "Check The Dan" (Duet Version) - 6:38

Charts

Music video

The music video is animated in stop-motion in a desert setting.

References 

1993 singles
Leila K songs
1993 songs
Songs written by Denniz Pop
Song recordings produced by Denniz Pop